Hoops Family Field at Veterans Memorial Soccer Complex is a 1,006-capacity soccer-specific stadium in Huntington, West Virginia where it is the home of Marshall University's men's and women's soccer teams. It was built on the former site of the Veterans Memorial Fieldhouse, which was demolished in order to build the stadium. An inaugural double-header took place on August 23, 2013. The men's team held a scrimmage against Marshall alumni from past years resulting in a 2–0 victory. The women's team faced the Campbell University Fighting Camels and won 3–0.

The stadium hosted the 2016 Conference USA Men's Soccer Tournament and the second round of the 2019 NCAA Tournament. "The Vet" has hosted the Mountain State Derby three times with the Thundering Herd amassing a record of 2-0-1.

Top attended games

References

External links
 

Soccer venues in West Virginia
Marshall Thundering Herd soccer
Buildings and structures in Huntington, West Virginia
College soccer venues in the United States
Sports venues completed in 2013
2013 establishments in West Virginia